This is a list of television programs currently broadcast (in first-run or reruns), scheduled to be broadcast or formerly broadcast on Disney Channel Portugal.

Programming

Current programming

Original programming

Live-action
Bunk'd (March 18, 2016 – present)
Raven's Home (February 16, 2018 – present)
Sydney to the Max (January 4, 2021 – present)
Secrets of Sulphur Springs (May 1, 2021 – present)

Animated
Mickey Mouse (September 13, 2013 – present)
Big City Greens (July 1, 2019 – present)
Amphibia (September 14, 2020 – present)
The Owl House (January 11, 2021 – present)
The Ghost and Molly McGee (February 21, 2022 – present)
Moon Girl and Devil Dinosaur (March 10, 2023 – present)

Reruns

Acquired programming

Other programming
Miraculous: Tales of Ladybug and Cat Noir (February 22, 2016 – present)
Sadie Sparks (February 3, 2020 – present)
Ghostforce (September, 2021 – present)
The Unstoppable Yellow Yeti (May 9, 2022 – present)

Former programming

Original programming

Animated series
Kim Possible (September 15, 2003 – June 20, 2008, first-run; June 21, 2008 – 2011, April 29, 2013 – 2014, reruns)
The Proud Family (September 20, 2003 – 2008, first-run; 2010 – 2011, reruns)
Lilo & Stitch: The Series (January 5, 2004 – 2007, first-run; 2007 – 2009, 2011 – 2014, reruns)
Dave the Barbarian (2004 – 2005, first-run; 2005 – 2009, Summer 2015 reruns)
Brandy and Mr. Whiskers (March 19, 2005 – 2007, first-run; 2007 – 2011, 2012, 2015 reruns)
The Buzz on Maggie (2005 – 2006)
American Dragon: Jake Long (April 18, 2005 – 2009, first-run; 2009 – 2011, reruns)
The Emperor's New School (June, 2006 – 2009, first-run; 2009 – 2014, reruns)
The Replacements (February 23, 2007 – 2009, first-run; 2009 – 2012, June 17, 2013 – 2014, reruns)
Phineas and Ferb (February 1, 2008 – September 12, 2015, first run; September 13, 2015 – 2016, 2018 reruns)
Fish Hooks (February 25, 2011 – 2012)
Gravity Falls (June 7, 2013 – June 1, 2016, first run; June 2, 2016 – January 13, 2023, reruns)
Elena of Avalor (October 8, 2016 – unknown)
Milo Murphy's Law (April 17, 2017 – April 9, 2020)
Tangled: The Series (June 3, 2017 – January 28, 2021)
DuckTales (November 11, 2017 – July 19, 2022)
Big Hero 6: The Series (October 12, 2018 – December 30, 2021)
101 Dalmatian Street (March 23, 2019 – 2022)

Situation comedies/comedy-drama series
Even Stevens (April, 2004 – 2007, first-run)
Lizzie McGuire (April, 2004 – 2007, first-run; 2007 – 2009, reruns)
That's So Raven (April, 2004 – 2008, first-run; 2008 – 2010, reruns)
Phil of the Future (June 2005 – 2007, first-run; 2007 – 2009, reruns)
The Suite Life of Zack & Cody (September, 2005 – 2008, first-run; 2008 – 2010, reruns)
Hannah Montana (September 15, 2006 – 2011, first-run, 2011 – September 30, 2013, Summer 2015, reruns)
Cory in the House (March, 2007 – 2009, first-run; 2009 – 2010, reruns)
Wizards of Waverly Place (January 18, 2008 – March 23, 2012, first run; March 24, 2012 – September 15, 2013, Summer 2015, reruns)
The Suite Life on Deck (January 16, 2009 – November 25, 2011, first-run; 2011 – September 15, 2013; Summer 2014; Summer 2015, reruns)
Sonny with a Chance (June 27, 2009 – 2011)
Jonas L.A. (September 13, 2009 – 2010)
Good Luck Charlie (October 8, 2010 – June 6, 2014, first run; June 6, 2014 – September 2015, reruns)
Shake It Up (April 8, 2011 – April 11, 2014, first-run; April 11, 2014 – September 2015, reruns)
So Random! (September 30, 2011 – 2012)
A.N.T. Farm (November 25, 2011 – Abril 18, 2014, first-run; April 19, 2014 – September 2015, reruns)
Jessie (February 10, 2012 – March 18, 2016, first-run; March 19, 2016 – September 2016, reruns)
Austin & Ally (May 11, 2012 – February 12, 2016, first-run; February 13, 2016 – June 2016, reruns)
Dog with a Blog (March 22, 2013 – March 25, 2016, first-run; March 26, 2016 – June 2016, reruns)
Violetta (September 16, 2013 – January 6, 2016, first-run)
Liv and Maddie (January 31, 2014  – Novembro 24, 2017, first-run)
I Didn't Do It (May 16, 2014  – July 15, 2016, first-run)
Girl Meets World (January 24, 2015  – December 16, 2016, first-run)
K.C. Undercover (May 23, 2015 – July 20, 2018, first-run)
Best Friends Whenever (January 11, 2016 – June 23, 2017, first-run)
Soy Luna (April 4, 2016 – December 21, 2018, first-run)
Stuck in the Middle (June 10, 2016 – November 22, 2018, first-run; November 23, 2018 – 2022, reruns)
Bizaardvark (September 18, 2017 – November 5, 2019, first-run)
Andi Mack (April 9, 2018 – May 14, 2018, first-run)
Fast Layne (May 17, 2019 – June 21, 2019, first-run)
Coop & Cami Ask the World (May 27, 2019 – 2022)
Gabby Duran & The Unsittables (March 9, 2020 – 2022)

Educational series
Art Attack (2002 – 2014)

Drama series
So Weird (2002 – 2003)

Reality series
PrankStars (December 16, 2011 – December 28, 2012)

Mini-series and specials
Disney Channel Games (2006 – 2008)
Studio DC: Almost Live (three-part special; 2008)
Disney's Friends for Change Games (June 2011)

Short series
Minuscule (2007 – 2010)
As the Bell Rings (2007 – 2010)
Brian O'Brian (September 20, 2008 – 2009)
Future-Worm! (July 3, 2015 – September, 2015)
Descendants: Wicked World (October 10, 2015 – April 1, 2017, first run; April 2, 2017 – present, reruns)

Disney XD series

Live-action series
Aaron Stone (2009 – 2011)
Zeke & Luther (2009 – 2012, first run; Summer 2015, reruns)
I'm in the Band (October 10, 2012 – 2013, first run; September 21, 2015 – 2016, reruns)
Pair of Kings (May 13, 2011 – April 19, 2014, first run; Summer 2015, reruns)
Lab Rats  (June 16, 2012 – January 13, 2023)
Kickin' It (September 22, 2012 – August 29, 2014, first-run)
Crash & Bernstein (January 17, 2014  – April 24, 2015, first-run)
Gamer's Guide to Pretty Much Everything (February 29, 2016 – July 29, 2017)

Animated series
Randy Cunningham: 9th Grade Ninja (July 5, 2014 – January 30, 2016, first run; January 31, 2016 – 2018, reruns)
Star Wars Rebels (October 25, 2014 – February 11, 2017, first-run)
Wander Over Yonder (January 3, 2015 – March 21, 2017, first-run)
The 7D (April 6, 2015 – July 21, 2017, first-run)
Star vs. the Forces of Evil (December 19, 2015 – January 10, 2020, first-run)

Notes

Acquired programming

Animated series
Mickey Mouseworks (2001 – 2002)
Jungle Cubs (2001 – 2002)
Mighty Ducks (2001 – 2002)
Doug (2001 – 2002)
Gargoyles (2001 – 2004)
The New Adventures of Winnie the Pooh (2001 – 2005, reruns)
101 Dalmatians: The Series (2001 – 2004, first-run; 2005, 2006 – 2007, 2015 reruns)
Pepper Ann (2001 – 2006, first-run; 2011, rerun)
Timon & Pumbaa (2001 – 2007, first-run; November 2, 2013 – 2014, reruns)
Hercules (2001 – 2008, first run; 2014 – 2015; reruns)
Recess (2001 – 2008, first-run; 2012 – October 31, 2012, reruns)
Goof Troop (2001 – 2007)
Quack Pack (2001 – 2004, first-run; 2013 – 2015, reruns)
Buzz Lightyear of Star Command (2001 – 2004, reruns)
House of Mouse (2002 – 2010)
Teacher's Pet (2002 – 2003, first-run; 2006 – 2007, reruns)
DuckTales (2002 – 2005, first-run; 2011 – 2012, reruns)
The Weekenders (2002 – 2004, first-run; 2007 – 2008, reruns)
Stanley (2002 – 2005)
The Legend of Tarzan (2002 – 2006)
Aladdin (2002 – 2008, first run; September 21, 2015 – 2016, reruns)
Sabrina: The Animated Series (2002 – 2007) 
Lloyd in Space (2003 – 2005, first-run; 2007 – 2008, reruns)
Bear in the Big Blue House (2003 – 2006) (English language only)
The Book of Pooh (2004 – 2006)
Teamo Supremo (2004 – 2006, first-run; 2009, reruns)
Fillmore! (June 2004 – 2006)
The Little Mermaid (2004 – 2006)
Dogtanian and the Three Muskehounds (2004 – 2006; 2009)
Sabrina's Secret Life (September, 2004 – 2007)
The Triplets (2005 – 2007)
JoJo's Circus (2006 – 2009)
Higglytown Heroes (2006 – 2009) 
Shanna's Show (2007 – 2009)
Lou and Lou: Safety Patrol (2007 – 2009)
My Friends Tigger & Pooh (September 21, 2007 – 2011)
Shaun the Sheep (2007 – 2009)
Famous 5: On the Case (June 28, 2008 – 2014)
Around the World with Willy Fog (2008 – 2009)
Pocket Dragon Adventures (2009)
Casper's Scare School (2009 – 2016)
W.I.T.C.H. (2010 – 2016)
Stitch! (2010 – 2012)
Marco e Monkey (2010)
Totally Spies (2010 – 2012)
The Jungle Book (2011 – 2014)
Kid vs. Kat (2011 – 2012, first run; Summer 2014, reruns)
Atomic Betty (2011 – 2014)
Rekkit Rabbit (July 21, 2012 – 2018)
Monster High (February 11, 2013 – 2014)
Littlest Pet Shop (June 1, 2013 – 2016)
Sandra the Fairytale Detective (September 21, 2013 – 2017)
Sabrina: Secrets of a Teenage Witch (September 15, 2014 – 2017)
Boyster (September 19, 2015 – 2018)
Tsum Tsum (2015 – 2017)
Hotel Transylvania: The Series (October 7, 2017 – 2020)

Live-action series
Honey, I Shrunk the Kids: The TV Show (2001 – 2004) (English language only)
Home Improvement (2001 – 2004) (English language only)
Dinosaurs (2001 – 2003) (English language only)
Brotherly Love (2001 – 2002) (English language only)
Boy Meets World (2002 – 2003) (English language only)
Teen Angel (2002 – 2003) (English language only)
Are You Afraid of the Dark? (2002 – 2004) (English language only)
Smart Guy (2002 – 2004) (English language only)
Lois & Clark: The New Adventures of Superman (2003) (English language only)
O Clube das Chaves (October 2006 – 2008)
Uma Aventura (2006 – 2009) 
Life with Derek (August 7, 2007 – 2010)
Floribella (September 10, 2007 – 2009)
Jonas Brothers: Living the Dream (2008 – 2010) (English language only)
Pirate Islands (2009 – 2010) (English language only)
The Saddle Club (2009 – 2012) (English language only)
The Sleepover Club (2009 – 2011) (English language only)
Dance Academy (2011)
H2O: Just Add Water (2011 – 2014; Summer 2015, reruns)
My Babysitter's a Vampire (October 19, 2011 – 2012; October 2013; October 2014; October 2015, reruns)
Mr. Young (January 7, 2013 – 2014)
The Next Step (April 13, 2015 – 2016)
Backstage (June 20, 2016 – 2016)

Club Houdini (April 28, 2018 – June 16, 2022)
Bia (October 7, 2019 – unknown)

Programming blocks

Current
Disneyespertador (2006; 2013 – present)
We Love Sextas (2010 – present; every Friday from 6 PM; premieres, new episodes and/or specials)
13 Dias de Halloween (Halloween block; October, 2011 – present)
Tu Escolhes (monthly special; April 13, 2015 – present)
Top 5 (top 5 episodes of the week; September 20, 2015 – present)

Former
Playhouse Disney (2001 – 2011)
ControlTV (2001 – 2002)
Hora dos Heróis (2001 – 2002)
Kabunga! (2001 – 2002)
Maratoon (2006 – 2009)
Tele Pequeno-Almoço (2008)
Disney Junior (2011 – June 2013)
Top 10 (top 10 episodes of the week; September 22, 2013 – June 7, 2015)

Former holiday blocks
Até que Enfim Halloween (Halloween 2006)
Verão de Estrelas (Summer 2009)
Feitiçoutubro (Halloween 2009 – 2010)
Natal de Estrelas (Christmas 2009)
It's On! (Summer 2010)
Um Natal com Surpresas (December 1, 2010 – December 31, 2012)
Sou Fã! (Summer 2012)
Um Verão de... (Summer 2013)
A Festa de Natal (Christmas 2013)
O Presentão de Natal (December 1, 2014 – December 25, 2014)

See also
 List of Disney Channel original movies
 List of Disney Channel original series

 
Disney Channel Portugal
Disney Channel related-lists